Action Now! was a Dutch pay television movie channel, broadcasting in the Netherlands and Flanders. The programming of the channel mainly consisted of action movies. In November 2008 Dutch largest cable company Ziggo removed Action Now! from its network, followed by Caiway on 1 April 2009. The availability of Action Now! dropped considerably in the Netherlands, resulting in the closure of the channel on 31 May 2009.

References

Television channels and stations established in 2006
Television channels and stations disestablished in 2009
2006 establishments in the Netherlands
2009 disestablishments in the Netherlands
Defunct television channels in the Netherlands
Defunct television channels in Belgium